GNL may refer to:

 Galveston National Laboratory, a biocontainment lab in Texas
 Gangulu language
 Gender-neutral language
 GFSN National League, a British amateur football league
 Ghandhara Nissan, a Pakistani automobile manufacturer
 Gordon Newey, a defunct British car manufacturer
 Green Lane railway station, in England
 Regucalcin, a protein